Sir Allan Cotton (died 25 December 1628) was an English merchant who was Lord Mayor of London in 1625. He was born in Whitchurch, Shropshire to Ralph Cotton of Alkington and Jane Cotton. Allan came from a Shropshire branch of the Chesire minor noble family Coton which had existed since the 13th century at least.

Cotton was a city of London merchant and a member of the Worshipful Company of Drapers. On 9 July 1616 he was elected an alderman of the City of London for Dowgate ward. He was Sheriff of London and Master of the Drapers Company for 1616 to 1617. He was knighted on 4 June 1626. In 1627 he became president of St Bartholomew's Hospital.

References

1558 births
People from Whitchurch, Shropshire 
1628 deaths
English merchants
Sheriffs of the City of London
17th-century lord mayors of London